Tore is a Scandinavian given name. 

Tore may also refer to:

 Tõre, Estonia, a village
 Tore, Scotland, a village
 Töre, Sweden, a locality
 Töre River, Sweden
 Tore (volcano), Papua New Guinea
Tore Station, a railway station in Latvia

People with the surname Tore
Elihan Tore (1885–1976), President of the Second East Turkistan Republic
Gökhan Töre (born 1992), Turkish footballer